The Luxgen U6 is a compact crossover (CUV) produced by the Taiwanese car company Luxgen. The compact crossover was also produced and sold in China by the Dongfeng-Yulon Luxgen joint venture.

Overview
The vehicle was developed under Yulon's R&D center, HAITEC. Based on the same platform as the Luxgen S5 compact car, the U6 crossover is Luxgen's first compact crossover positioned under the U7 7 seater SUV. A minor update was done in 2014, featuring the new Eco Hyper engine technology. Gearbox: 5-speed automatic or 5-speed manual for the 1.8 turbo, and a 6-speed automatic for the 2.0 turbo. 

The Luxgen U6 used to be called Luxgen U6 Turbo Eco Hyper in Taiwan. A facelift model was launched in 2017 Shanghai Motor Show. It went on sale in November, 2017 in Taiwan. Its competitor worldwide is the BYD Song.

References

External links

 Luxgen China
 Luxgen U6 Official Taiwanese Website

U6
Front-wheel-drive vehicles
Compact sport utility vehicles

Cars introduced in 2013